Nicole Muirbrook (born March 19, 1983) is an American model and actress.

Early life
Muirbrook was born in Salt Lake City, Utah.

Career
As a model, Muirbrook has appeared on the covers of Vanidades, Vogue Girl, Blush and Bella.

Muirbrook appeared in an episode of the US sitcom How I Met Your Mother with some theorizing that she would eventually play Ted Mosby's Future Wife (something that was eventually proven false). She played Thalia in The Human Contract, which was directed by Jada Pinkett Smith. Her highest profile appearance is in a commercial for Lynx Bullet.

She stars in the 2009 film I Hope They Serve Beer in Hell as Christina.

She is the face model for Nvidia's tech demo, "Medusa".

Filmography

Film

Television

Personal life 
Muirbrook was previously married to editor Christian Wagner. She married screenwriter Taylor Sheridan in 2013. They reside in Weatherford, Texas.

References

External links
 

1983 births
Living people
21st-century American women
Female models from Utah
Actresses from Salt Lake City